(), also known as  (also written as ) and referred as  in Okinawan, is the traditional dress of the Ryukyuan people.  is a form of formal attire; it is customary to wear it on occasions such as wedding ceremony and the coming-of-age ceremony. The  became popular during the Ryukyu Kingdom period. It was originally worn by the members of the royal family and by the nobles of Ryukyu Kingdom. The Ryukyu Kingdom was originally an independent nation which established trade relationship with many countries in Southeast Asia (Java, Malacca, and Palembang) and East Asia; they held their relationship with China as especially important.

Construction and design 

The  shows a combination of Chinese and Japanese influences as well as local, native originality. Robes which crossed in the front was worn by both the working and upper classes; however, they differed in length (from knee to ankle length). The working class would wear a knee-length robe while the upper classes would wear robes which were ankle-length.

Men's  differ from women's  in terms of colour, design, and material. Men would secure their robes with a sash or girdle but women would hold theirs with a pin. The  for women is based on the  style of dyework.  could only be afforded by the people who had a rank and were wealthy.  textiles were strictly supervised by the royal court. It is also suggested by Japanese scholar Yoshitaro Kamakura that the dyeing and painting techniques, styles, materials, motifs (e.g.

Only men of royalty and from the warring class were allowed to wear  and trousers as an undergarment.

Differences to kimono 
Due to the differences in climate and culture, Ryukyuan clothing differed to that worn on mainland Japan. Compared to the kimono, the  has big sleeve openings, which allows for good air circulation to keep its wearer cool in tropical weather. The  also uses a thin waistband instead of the wider  worn with the kimono. The  is also very light, mobile and loosely-tailored compared to the kimono. The  is generally shorter than the kimono.

History

Pre-14th century 

Cotton was exported to the Ryukyuan Kingdom as early as 219 BC from China. The Ryukyuans appear to have started weaving around the time there was initial contact with China, most likely during the Han dynasty. This was probably from the time that there was contact with Han [China]".

In the 5th century, oxen and swine were introduced to the islands which would also provided a source of clothing. According to a 5th-century records, the Ryukyu people only covered the upper parts of their bodies.

By the 7th to 8th centuries, people were already producing hand-woven fabric of cotton and other leaf fibers.

From the time of King Shunten's reign (1187–1237) to King Gihon (1249–1259), clothing which was characteristic of the Ryukyuan people had developed. The clothing was later recorded through illustrations; it was depicted in a 14th century book. During the reign of King Eiso, Buddhism was introduced to the Ryukyuan Kingdom from Japan. The robes of Buddhist priests may have served as the basis in design source for the development of the people's clothing.

14th–16th century

Tributary relationship with China and Japan 
Tributary relationships with the Ming dynasty were established in 1372 by the three kingdoms of Sanzan. In 1372, the King of Chūzan entered into a tributary relationship with the Ming dynasty, and paid tribute for 500 years for trading privileges and diplomatic ties.

From the reign of Satto to the 16th century, Chinese influence on the Ryukyuan Kingdom was significant, while Japanese influence faded. According to a historical record known as :

In the 15th century, textile development in Ryukyu showed Indian, Indonesian, and Chinese influences. During the reign of King Shō Shin, a decree was made in an effort to codify and ritualize the dress code as an expression of one's social status and ranks; colours were then used to distinguish the upper and lower ranks, thus defining the elite identity in Ryukyu Kingdom. This decree by King Shō Shin was a situation where Chinese practices were localized in the Ryukyu Kingdom. Ming-style clothing for officials and daily clothing were made for the Ryukyu kings and his officials. The regal insignia was a Ryukyuan innovation, which was loosely based on the Ming dynasty regulations of dress codification. Dragon robes with 5-clawed dragon motifs (called  or ), which resembled the dragon robes of the Ming dynasty emperor, were used by the King of Ryukyu. Yellow clothing was restricted to the ruling family of Ryukyu as in China.

King Shō Shin was also the first to established a headwear system composed of hairpins and -style caps with varying colours according to the official ranks of its wearer. The use of  may have been a custom which had been influenced by South Asian countries. The hairpins were also strictly regulated along with clothing during this period: Kings wore gold hairpins, which were decorated with a dragon, while a phoenix head decorated the hairpins of the queens; people of noble birth wore gold hairpins, silver hairpins were worn by feudal lords, brass hairpins by merchants and farmers; pewter or plain wood hairpins were worn by the people of the poorest status. Commoners could wear hairpins with tortoise shell in alternative hexagonal shapes of black and yellow during state occasions.

The Chinese never attempted to impose their culture on the Ryukyuans. The Ryukyu people used some Chinese designs and fabrics in making; however, they also cut it in a way which would suit local tastes and whose design was practical for daily life. This allowed the Ryukyu people to be culturally independent from China. Chinese silks bestowed to the Ryukyuan people were also transformed by the local artisans in Ryukyu to make ceremonial garments; these silk ceremonial garments differed from the hemp-based clothing that most commoners would make as their clothing.

The  was a winter ceremonial clothing worn by the Ryukyuan kings. The  was slightly modified from the clothing gifted by the Ming dynasty, and included unique Ryukyuan features, such as fringes at the back of the garment, while maintaining the style of Ming dynasty court clothing. Male undergarments consisted of a white silk , a cross-collared upper garment closed left over right, and white silk trousers. Only members of the royal family and members of upper-class warrior families were allowed to wear these undergarments. The emperor also wore  and trousers as undergarments under his .

17th century 
After Satsuma subjugated the Ryuku islands in 1609, Satsuma controlled the islands and intentionally ceded to China's ritual authority over the Ryukyu Kingdom in order to win the economic profit from the tribute trade with China. In order to hide the dual sovereignty, the Ryukyuans were forbidden from being assimilated into Japanese culture, and they were encouraged to continue wearing their traditional clothing and speak in the local language. When Ryukyuan envoys would visit Edo, they had to wear Chinese clothing. The reigns of Shō Tei to Shō Eki and Shō Kei were eras of strong Japanese influence, although the sentiment of the Ryukyu people were pro-Chinese.

Following the fall of the Ming dynasty, the Ryukyu continued to follow the Ming dynasty's court fashion and styled their own clothing with dragon emblems which were bestowed by the Qing dynasty.

From 1681, men of ranks started to wear , which was folded 7 or 9 times at the forehead and 11 or 12 at the back.

Annexation of the Ryukyu Kingdom 

Japanese influences increased from the year 1874, when the last King was taken prisoner in Tokyo and when Japan forbade the exchange of envoys with China. The Ryukyu Kingdom was eventually abolished and the islands were annexed without consent by the Meiji government. Between the years 1879 and 1895, many cultural and institutional characteristics of the Ryuku kingdom were preserved. However, following the arrival of Governor Shigeru Narahara, an aggressive form of cultural assimilation took place in the form of Japanization, leading to traditional Ryukyuan clothing being discouraged. The clothing of the Ryukyu people were influenced by the Japanese, and Japanese-style clothing was increasingly adopted. After the World War II, Ryukyuan bridal clothing did not show any native Ryukyuan influence, and was instead of Japanese origin.

Types of garment and headwear 

  – a cross-collared upper garment. For men, it was used as ceremonial undergarment along with trousers; it was only used by the members of the royal family and the upper class warrior families.
 – trousers.
 – , it is worn women by women when performing traditional Ryukyuan dance, .
 – a pleated skirt with a long train; it was reserved for ladies of the upper class.
  – a summer robe worn by women of the royal family.
  – Royal crown, part of formal clothing for the Ryukyu king; it was bestowed by the Chinese Emperor. It was worn on important events, such as Sappo (enthronement of the King) and on the New Year's celebration.
 – a lined or padded winter wear for both men and women; it was a form of formal wear in winter.
It was worn by the royal family.

Gallery

See also 
 
 Kimono
 Kariyushi shirt

References